Rodolfo Negri (born 20 June 1913, date of death unknown) was an Italian professional football player.

1913 births
Year of death missing
Italian footballers
Serie A players
Mantova 1911 players
Inter Milan players
Novara F.C. players
A.C. Legnano players
A.C. Reggiana 1919 players
Association football midfielders